Horseshoes and Hand Grenades is the 1992 debut solo album by Chris Mars.

The album contains the hit song "Popular Creeps," which denounces snooty high school cliques. Most songs seem to cover break-ups; mental illness; homelessness as a trend; alienation; and apparently the rest of his former band, The Replacements.

The track, "Better Days," is about being sick from school and experiencing hallucinations from tainted cold medicine.

Though Mars performs primarily as a one-man band, J.D. Foster plays the bass guitar. Dan Murphy and David Pirner from Soul Asylum guest on "Monkey Sees," "Before It Began," and "City Lights on Mars."

Track listing
All songs written and arranged by Chris Mars.
"Reverse Status" (3:12)  
"Popular Creeps" (3:04)  
"Outer Limits" (3:17)  
"Before it Began" (3:51)  
"Get Out of My Life" (3:17)  
"Monkey Sees" (3:55)  
"Ego Maniac" (2:34)  
"Midnight Carnival" (4:17)  
"I, Me, We, Us, Them" (3:43)  
"Don't You See It" (3:51)  
"Happy Disconnections" (3:11)  
"Better Days" (3:03)  
"City Lights on Mars" (2:49)
"Last Drop" (3:33)

Personnel
Chris Mars - vocals, acoustic and electric guitars, keyboards, drums, percussion
Dan Murphy - lead guitar on track 13, backing vocals
J.D. Foster - bass
David Pirner - trumpet on track 6, backing vocals

References

1992 debut albums
Chris Mars albums